Chiloglanis harbinger is a species of upside-down catfish endemic to Cameroon where it is found in the Lokunje River basin.  This species grows to a length of  SL.

References

External links 

harbinger
Freshwater fish of Africa
Fish of Cameroon
Endemic fauna of Cameroon
Fish described in 1989